Klara MacAskill (born December 31, 1964 in Budapest) is a Hungarian-born, Canadian sprint kayaker who competed in the early to mid-1990s.

Accomplishments 
MacAskill won a bronze medal in the K-4 200 m event at the 1994 ICF Canoe Sprint World Championships in Mexico City.

She also competed in two Summer Olympics, earning her best finish of fifth on two occasions (1992: K-2 500 m, 1996: K-4 500 m).

References

Sports-reference.com profile

1964 births
Canoeists from Budapest
Hungarian emigrants to Canada
Canadian female canoeists
Canoeists at the 1992 Summer Olympics
Canoeists at the 1996 Summer Olympics
Hungarian female canoeists
Living people
Olympic canoeists of Canada
ICF Canoe Sprint World Championships medalists in kayak